Hakim Mazou (born 19 January 1970) is a Congolese hurdler. He competed in the men's 110 metres hurdles at the 1996 Summer Olympics.

References

1970 births
Living people
Athletes (track and field) at the 1980 Summer Olympics
Republic of the Congo male hurdlers
Olympic athletes of the Republic of the Congo
Place of birth missing (living people)